Paul Robert Sanchez, (born November 26, 1946) is an American prelate of the Roman Catholic Church who served as an auxiliary bishop for the Diocese of Brooklyn in New York City from 2012 to 2022.

Biography

Early life 
Paul Sanchez was born in Brooklyn, New York, on November 26, 1946. He attended St. Vincent Ferrer High School in Manhattan, Cathedral Preparatory Seminary in Queens, New York, and Cathedral College of the Immaculate Conception in Douglaston, New York.  Sanchez then entered St. Bonaventure University in Saint Bonaventure, New York.

Priesthood 
Sanchez was ordained into the priesthood by then Bishop James Hickey for the Diocese of Brooklyn on December 17, 1971. Sanchez holds a Bachelor of Sacred Theology degree and a Licentiate in Sacred Theology from the Pontifical Gregorian University in Rome. Sanchez also served as the episcopal vicar of Queens. He also earned a Master of Liturgical Studies degree from the University of Notre Dame in Indiana. Sanchez's pastoral assignments in New York City included:

 Parochial vicar of Our Lady of Mercy Parish in Forest Hills, St. Michael Parish in Flushing, and St. Sebastian Parish in Woodside
 Pastor of St. Agatha Parish in Brooklyn and Our Lady of Mount Carmel Parish in Queens

Auxiliary Bishop of Brooklyn
Sanchez was appointed titular bishop of Coeliana and auxiliary bishop of the Diocese of Brooklyn on May 2, 2012, by Benedict XVI. He was consecrated by Bishop Nicholas DiMarzio on July 11, 2012. As auxiliary bishop, Sanchez also served as the pastor of Our Lady, Queen of Martyrs Parish in Forest Hills.  Sanchez was an adjunct instructor of theology at Saint John's University and the Seminary of the Immaculate Conception in Huntington, New York.

On reaching age 75, Sanchez sent a letter of retirement to as auxiliary bishop of Brooklyn to Pope Francis.  The pope accepted his retirement on March 30, 2022.

See also
 

Roman Catholic Diocese of Brooklyn
 Catholic Church hierarchy
 Catholic Church in the United States
 Historical list of the Catholic bishops of the United States
 List of Catholic bishops of the United States
 Lists of patriarchs, archbishops, and bishops

References

External links
 Roman Catholic Diocese of Brooklyn Official Site

Episcopal succession
 

}

1946 births
Bishops
Living people